Bull (translit. Vula) is a 1965 Bulgarian drama film written and directed by Nikola Korabov. It was entered into the 4th Moscow International Film Festival.

Cast
 Nadezhda Randzheva as Nadezhda
 Ivan Manov as Osadeniyat na smart
 Lyuben Boyadzhiev
 Dimitar Hadzhiyanev
 Ivan Bratanov
 Mikhail Mikhajlov as Sveshtenikat
 Boris Arabow
 Stoycho Mazgalov
 Zharko Pavlovich as Nemski ofitzer

References

External links
 

1965 films
1965 drama films
Bulgarian drama films
1960s Bulgarian-language films
Bulgarian black-and-white films
Films directed by Nikola Korabov